Palazzo Costanzo is a palace in Mdina, Malta, situated on Villegaignon Street. It was formerly the residence of a noble Sicilian family, having been constructed in 1666 by Tomaso Costanzo. The building was later converted into a restaurant. It also hosts the Medieval Times Show, which provides an insight into local life in the 14th and 15th centuries.

The building has two floors along with underground cellars. Its façade is symmetrical, and it includes a rectangular doorway, above which is a small oval window and an open balcony. Two windows flank the door and balcony on either side. The corbels and surrounds of the doors and windows are decorated with simple designs.

It is scheduled as a Grade 1 monument and it is listed on the National Inventory of the Cultural Property of the Maltese Islands.

References

Costanzo
Mdina
Houses completed in 1666
Limestone buildings in Malta
Restaurants in Malta
Tourist attractions in Malta
National Inventory of the Cultural Property of the Maltese Islands
1666 establishments in Malta